 

Stokes County Schools is a public school system in Stokes County, North Carolina, serving students in grades pre-K – 12, in 19 public schools.

Schools

High schools (9 – 12)

North Stokes High School
South Stokes High School
West Stokes High School

Dual enrollment high school

Stokes Early College (9 – 12, with optional 13th year)

Middle schools (6 – 8)

Chestnut Grove Middle School
Piney Grove Middle School
Southeastern Stokes Middle School

Elementary schools (K – 5)

Germanton Elementary School
King Elementary School (pre-K available)
Lawsonville Elementary School
London Elementary School (pre-K available)
Mount Olive Elementary School
Nancy Reynolds Elementary School
Pine Hall Elementary School
Pinnacle Elementary School (pre-K available)
Poplar Springs Elementary School (pre-K available)
Sandy Ridge Elementary School
Walnut Cove Elementary School

Alternative school

Meadowbrook Academy (6 – 12)

References

External links
Stokes County Schools
NC School Report Card District Snapshot for Stokes County Schools

Education in Stokes County, North Carolina
School districts in North Carolina